Samuel Andrés Pérez Álvarez (born 27 August 1992) is a Guatemalan economist and politician. He has been a member of Congress since January 2020.

References 

1992 births
Living people
Guatemalan politicians
Guatemalan economists
Guatemalan activists
People from Guatemala City
Members of the Congress of Guatemala
Rafael Landívar University alumni